Drosera erythrogyne is a scrambling or climbing perennial tuberous species in the genus Drosera that is endemic to Western Australia. It grows in soils that are peat-sand to loam and occurs in an area along the southern Western Australian coast west of Albany in swamps or near granite outcrops. White flowers emerge from August to October.

D. erythrogyne was first described and named by N. G. Marchant and Allen Lowrie in 1992.

See also 
List of Drosera species

References 

Carnivorous plants of Australia
Caryophyllales of Australia
Eudicots of Western Australia
Plants described in 1992
erythrogyne